Mr. Boo Meets Pom Pom (Chinese: 智勇三寶) is a 1985 Hong Kong comedy film directed by Wu Ma and starring Richard Ng and John Shum. It is the third film in the Pom Pom film series which is a spin-off the Lucky Stars series.

Plot
Working at the police forensic department Mr Boo (Michael Hui) although absent-minded and scruffy is successful at his job. His beautiful wife (Terry Hu) begin to be courted by handsome billionaire Yang (Stuart Ong) and now Mr Boo must try to win back her love. While on a job involving a bank robbery he befriend detectives Chow (Richard Ng) and Beethoven (John Shum) who promise to help him with his love life.

Cast
 Michael Hui as Mr. Boo
 Terry Hu as Mr. Boo's wife
 Richard Ng Yiu-Hon as officer Ng Ah Chiu
 John Shum Kin-Fun as officer Beethoven
 Deannie Yip Tak-Han as Anna, Ng's lover
 Stuart Ong as Yang

References

External links
 
 

1980s Cantonese-language films
Hong Kong comedy films
Films directed by Wu Ma
1985 comedy films
1985 films
1980s Hong Kong films